Mohamed Tawfik Naseem Pasha (June 30, 1871 – March 8, 1938) was an Egyptian political figure of Turkish origin. He served as the prime minister of Egypt between May 1920 and 1921, again from 1922 until 1923, and finally between 1934 and 1936. He was also Minister of the Interior under Yusuf Wahba Pasha from November 1919 to May 1920. He was Minister of Finance in 1924.

He went to lawschool where he met other notable Egyptians such as the intellectual and activist Ahmed Lutfi el-Sayed, Isma'il Sedky, and the journalist Mustafa Kamil.

He was appointed Honorary Knight Grand Cross of the Order of St Michael and St George (GCMG) by King George V of the United Kingdom in December 1920. He married on 9 August 1901 the Egyptian Princess Munira (28 October 1884 - 18 November 1944) a granddaughter of Isma'il Pasha (paternal side) and a great-granddaughter of Abbas I of Egypt (maternal side), but divorced on 12 March 1924.

Footnotes

1871 births
1938 deaths
19th-century Egyptian people
20th-century prime ministers of Egypt
Prime Ministers of Egypt
Finance Ministers of Egypt
Egyptian people of Turkish descent
Honorary Knights Grand Cross of the Order of St Michael and St George
Interior Ministers of Egypt
Egyptian pashas
Endowments Ministers of Egypt